Tis Ellados ta Paidia is a Greek comedy television series that was aired for two seasons (1993–1994 and 1994–1995) by ANT1 TV. The series was created by Dimitris Venizelos and it stars Giannis Bezos, Chrysoula Diavati, Nikos Alexiou, Kostas Evripiotis, Yannis Savvidakis, Dimitris Fragioglou, Yannis Kapetanios and others.

The series became great success and it is often selected by the audience as one of the best Greek TV-series of all times. It is maybe the first Greek surrealist comedy. The series included nice dialogues with clever cues.

Plot
Three aircraftmen have their military service in an aviation office camp, commanded by Group Captain Epaminondas Kakalos. Kakalos is a strict commander, but he is also ambitious, flirtatious and sometimes blunderer. Other basic members of the cast are Hlapatsas, a nark aircraftman, Karavaneas, a naive sergeant and Boubou, the commander's secretary. The series is based on the funny situations between the staff of this aviation camp.

Cast
Giannis Bezos as Group Captain Epaminondas Kakalos
Nikos Alexiou as Aircraftman Dimosthenis Plapoutas
Kostas Evripiotis as Aircraftman Georgios Vlachos
Yannis Savvidakis as Aircraftman Giovanni Dallas
Chrysoula Diavati as Boubou
Dimitris Fragioglou as Aircraftman Trifon Spiouneas aka Hlapatsas
Yannis Kapetanios as Sergeant Charalampos Karavaneas

References

External links

ANT1 original programming
Greek comedy television series
1993 Greek television series debuts
1995 Greek television series endings
1990s Greek television series